The Damascus International Championship, also known as Syriatel Cup for sponsorship reasons. Was a sporting event where clubs from UAFA member countries participated in the competition, which was administered by the Syrian Arab Federation for Football. The tournament was held in 2004, 2005, and 2009, with official recognition from multiple football federations, including the SAFF. Whereas in other years of the tournament, it contested different sports, including judo, tennis, and equestrianism. It was recently cancelled due to political upheaval in the country.

Winners

References

International association football competitions hosted by Syria
International sports competitions hosted by Syria